Joe Rizzo may refer to:
 Joe Rizzo (American football)
 Joe Rizzo (baseball)